Qerkhlar (also Romanized as Qarkhlār and Qerekhlar; also known as Gherkhlar) is a village in Chah Dasht Rural District, Shara District, Hamadan County, Hamadan Province, Iran. At the 2006 census, its population was 1,962, in 431 families.

References 

Populated places in Hamadan County